The ASU Soccer Stadium at Ted Mackorell Soccer Complex is a soccer-specific stadium in Boone, North Carolina and is home to the Appalachian State Mountaineers women's soccer team. The stadium, which is part of the Ted Mackorell Soccer Complex, opened for its first game in 2008 against the College of Charleston Cougars.  

The stadium is a replacement for the old ASU Soccer Stadium, which was opened in 2005.

In June 2019, Field 2 had new turf installed at a cost of $411,000.

References

External links
 Appalachian Soccer Stadium at GoASU

Appalachian State Mountaineers soccer
Soccer venues in North Carolina
Sports venues in Watauga County, North Carolina
2008 establishments in North Carolina
Sports venues completed in 2008